Fortuna is the Roman goddess of luck.

Fortuna (Latin for "fortune") can also mean:

Places

South Georgia Island
 Fortuna Bay, South Georgia Island
 Fortuna Glacier, South Georgia Island

United States
 Fortuna, Arizona, a ghost town
 Fortuna, California, a city
 Fortuna, Missouri, an unincorporated community
 Fortuna, North Dakota, a small city
 Fortuna, U.S. Virgin Islands, a settlement
 Fargo, California, a former settlement also called Fortuna

Elsewhere
 Fortuna, San Luis, a village and municipality in Argentina
 Fortuna, Maranhão, a municipality in Brazil
 Fortuna, Murcia, a town in Spain
 Fortuna Forest Reserve, Panama
 19 Fortuna, an asteroid

People
 Fortuna (surname)
 Diego Mazquiarán (1895-1940), Spanish matador known as Fortuna
 Fortuna (Brazilian singer), female singer and composer from Brazil

Arts and entertainment
 Fortuna (album), a 2019 album by Italian singer Emma
 "Fortuna", a 2022 single by Chinese singer Lexie Liu
 Fortuna (film), an Israeli film directed by Menahem Golan
 Fortuna (telenovela), a 2013 Mexican telenovela
 Bib Fortuna, a Star Wars character
 Fortuna, a name for Bagatelle, a game developed from billiard
 Fortuna, a town on Venus in the online game Warframe

Ships
 Costa Fortuna, a cruise ship built in 2003
 Fortuna (steamboat), a vessel that operated on Lake Washington in the early 20th century
 Fortuna, various yachts used by Spanish King Juan Carlos I

Sports
 ACS Fortuna Covaci, a Romanian football club
 Stadionul Fortuna (Fortuna Stadium), Covaci, Romania
 CD Fortuna, a Spanish football team from Leganés
 FC Fortuna Mytishchi, a former Russian football team (2003-2009)
 FC Fortuna Sharhorod, a Ukrainian football club
 FK Fortuna Skopje, a Macedonian football club
 Fortuna Ålesund, a Norwegian women's football club
 Fortuna Düsseldorf, a German football club
 Fortuna Hjørring, a Danish women's football team
 Fortuna Liga or Slovak Super Liga, the top football league in Slovakia
 Fortuna Sittard, a Dutch football club
 Fortuna Vlaardingen, a Dutch football club
 SC Fortuna Köln, a German football club
 SV Fortuna Magdeburg, a German football club
 VfB Fortuna Chemnitz, a German football club

Other uses
 Fortuna Air Force Station, North Dakota, an abandoned Air Force Long Range radar site
 Fortuna station (SEPTA), a railway station in Hatfield, Pennsylvania
 Fortuna railway station (Mexico City), operated by Ferrocarriles Suburbanos
 Fortuna (cigarette), a cigarette brand owned by Altadis
 Fortuna (PRNG), an algorithm for cryptographically secure pseudo-random number generation
 Fortuna, a genetically modified potato developed by BASF Plant Science

See also
 Fortune (disambiguation)
 La Fortuna (disambiguation)
 O Fortuna (album), a 2009 studio album by Welsh classical singer Rhydian
 "O Fortuna", a 13th-century medieval Latin Goliardic poem; set to music by Carl Orff